Andreas Buchwald (born 2 February 1969) is an Austrian former professional tennis player.

Buchwald made a Grand Prix (ATP Tour) main draw appearance in doubles at the Austrian Open Kitzbühel in 1989, partnering with Stefan Lochbihler. He reached a best singles world ranking of 490 and featured in the qualifying draw of the 1990 Australian Open, where he was eliminated by Cristiano Caratti.

References

External links
 
 

1969 births
Living people
Austrian male tennis players